The Fourth Atkinson Ministry was a responsible government  in New Zealand, which lasted less than a week. It formed on 28 August 1884 after the fall of the first attempt at a Stout-Vogel coalition and lasted until Robert Stout and Sir Julius Vogel took back their majority on 3 September.

Background
After the 1884 general election, in which a number of factions were returned to the House, a brief coalition between Sir Julius Vogel and Robert Stout took office, but was immediately ousted in a confidence motion proposed by James William Thomson. Thomson failed for form an alternative majority and advised the Governor to call Sir George Grey; Grey attempted to form a coalition with ex-Premier Harry Atkinson but was unsuccessful as Atkinson believed their followings would refuse to combine. Atkinson was then appointed Premier and attempted to come to an arrangement with Robert Stout, but failed.

Within a week, the ephemeral Fourth Atkinson Government was unseated in another no-confidence vote, this time with the Greyites voting them down in revenge for the earlier snub.

Atkinson’s Ministry included Edward Wakefield, a nephew of Edward Gibbon Wakefield, who had pledged at the election to oppose Atkinson. After the fall of the Government, Wakefield’s constituents presented him with a large dead rat.

Ministers
The following members served in the fourth Atkinson Ministry:

See also
 New Zealand Government

Notes

References

Ministries of Queen Victoria
Governments of New Zealand
1884 establishments in New Zealand
Atkinson Ministry
Atkinson Ministry